The Hudson Highlands Multiple Resource Area is a Multiple Property Submission study supporting multiple listings in 1982 to the United States National Register of Historic Places. It originally included 58 properties spread over the counties of Dutchess, Putnam, Westchester, Orange and Rockland.

Properties

Amelia Barr House, Cornwall-on-Hudson
Bannerman's Island Arsenal, Fishkill
Bear Mountain Bridge Cortlandt and Stony Point
Bear Mountain Bridge Road and Toll House
Bear Mountain State Park Historic District
Camp Olmsted, Cornwall-on-Hudson
Church of the Holy Innocents and Rectory, Highland Falls
Cragston Dependencies, Highland Falls
Cold Spring Cemetery Gatehouse, Nelsonville
Cold Spring Historic District, Cold Spring
Deer Hill, Cornwall-on-Hudson
Dutchess Manor, Fishkill
Dragon Rock, Garrison
Eagle's Rest, Garrison
Fair Lawn, Cold Spring
First Baptist Church of Cold Spring, Nelsonville
First Presbyterian Church of Highland Falls, Highland Falls
Fish and Fur Club, Nelsonville
Garrison Landing Historic District, Garrison
Garrison Union Free School, Garrison
Gatehouse on Deerhill Road, Cornwall-on-Hudson
Glenfields, Garrison
Highland Falls Railroad Depot, Highland Falls
Highland Falls Village Hall, Highland Falls
House at 116 Main Street, Highland Falls
House at 249 Main Street, Nelsonville
House at 3 Crown Street, Nelsonville
House at 37 Center Street, Highland Falls
Hurst-Pierrepont Estate, Garrison
Hustis House, Nelsonville
H. D. Champlin & Son Horseshoeing and Wagonmaking, Nelsonville
J. Y. Dykman Flour and Feed Store, Nelsonville
J. Y. Dykman Store, Nelsonville
LeDoux/Healey House, Cornwall-on-Hudson
Mandeville House, Garrison
Montrest, Cold Spring
Moore House, Garrison
Mount Beacon Incline Railway, Beacon
Normandy Grange, Garrison
Old Albany Post Road, Philipstown
Oulagisket, Garrison
Parry House, Highland Falls
Pine Terrace, Highland Falls
Plumbush, Cold Spring
River View House, Cornwall-on-Hudson
Rock Lawn and Carriage House, Garrison
St. Mark's Episcopal Church, Fort Montgomery
St. Philip's Church in the Highlands, Garrison
Stonihurst, Highland Falls
Storm King Highway, Cornwall and Highlands
The Birches, Garrison
The Squirrels, Highland Falls
Walker House, Garrison
Walter Thompson House, Garrison
Webb Lane House, Highland Falls
Wilson House, Garrison
Woodlawn, Garrison

References
Hudson Highlands Multiple Resource Area, New York State Office of Parks, Recreation and Historic Preservation.

National Register of Historic Places Multiple Property Submissions
National Register of Historic Places in New York (state)
Hudson Highlands